PP-55 Gujranwala-III is a Constituency of  Provincial Assembly of Punjab.

General elections 2013

General elections 2008

See also
 PP-54 Gujranwala-II
 PP-56 Gujranwala-IV

References

External links
 Election commission Pakistan's official website
 Awazoday.com check result
 Official Website of Government of Punjab

Provincial constituencies of Punjab, Pakistan